The Mérantaise is a small river in southern Île-de-France (France), left tributary of the Yvette, which is a tributary of the Orge. Its source is in Voisins-le-Bretonneux, near Versailles, in the Yvelines department.

Geography
The Yvette crosses the following départements and towns:
Yvelines départment : Voisins-le-Bretonneux, Magny-les-Hameaux,
Essonne départment : Saint-Aubin, Villiers-le-Bâcle, Gif-sur-Yvette

References

Rivers of France
Rivers of Essonne
Rivers of Île-de-France